The canton of Meaux-Nord is a French former administrative division, located in the arrondissement of Meaux, in the Seine-et-Marne département (Île-de-France région). It was disbanded following the French canton reorganisation which came into effect in March 2015.

Demographics

Composition 
The canton of Meaux-Nord was composed of 9 communes:

Barcy
Chambry
Crégy-lès-Meaux
Germigny-l'Évêque
Meaux (partly)
Chauconin-Neufmontiers
Penchard
Poincy
Varreddes

See also
Cantons of the Seine-et-Marne department
Communes of the Seine-et-Marne department

References

Meaux Nord
2015 disestablishments in France
States and territories disestablished in 2015